Kenny Kosek (born 1949 in The Bronx, New York), is an American fiddler who plays bluegrass, country, klezmer, folk music and roots music. In addition to his solo career, he has performed with many other well-known performers and contributed to film and television soundtrack music. He is also a musical educator. Beyond the field of music, he is also known for his humor. He is a graduate of Bronx High School of Science and City College of New York.

Influences and performing career 
Kenny Kosek's early musical influences included Clark Kessinger, Vassar Clements, The New Lost City Ramblers, Kenny Baker and the May Brothers - Andy and Henry. While attending college, he played with The Star Spangled String Band and The Livingstone Cowboys, and freelanced in the Bleecker Street folk scene. His first post-collegiate professional work was as a member of the David Bromberg Band, and with a short-lived rock band, White Cloud, led by legendary hipster producer Thomas Jefferson Kaye. With Citizen Kafka and John Goodman, he wrote for and performed in the Citizen Kafka Show, a monthly improv and sketch comedy show that ran on WBAI-FM in New York City through the 1980s, and as "Johnny Angry Red Weltz" was part of Citizen Kafka's influential newgrass group, the Wretched Refuse String Band. He is similarly a part of Margot Leverett's fusion quintet The Klezmer Mountain Boys.

Musical backup and background music 
Kosek has played backup on hundreds of albums, soundtracks, and jingles. He has recorded with James Taylor, Jerry Garcia, Vassar Clements, David Byrne, Chaka Kahn, Boy George, Willie Nelson, Steve Goodman, Tom Chapin, Tony Trischka, David Bromberg, Bill Keith, Doug Sahm, Leonard Cohen, and John Denver and performed with the Late Night Band on Late Night with David Letterman and in Sting's annual benefit for the rainforests at Carnegie Hall. His distinctive roots-music-inspired sound has been part of the soundtracks of many documentaries including The Way West, The Donner Party, Harlan County, U.S.A., The High Lonesome Sound, and the television shows Another World (NBC), The Guiding Light (CBS), and The Kirby Kids (Fox).

As a musical educator 
Kosek is deeply involved with music education. His musical instruction videos Learning Country Fiddle, Learning Bluegrass Fiddle, and Bluegrass Classics are available from Homespun Tapes and Videos. He has been a guest instructor at the Falun Folk Festival, Sweden, Tonder, Denmark Festival, the Sore Fingers Music camp, Cotswolds, England, the Big Apple Bluegrass Festival (1998–2002), and the Rathcoole, Ireland Folk Arts Festival (2004). He is a staff instructor in country fiddle at the Turtle Bay Music School in New York City. With Stacy Phillips, he co-authored Bluegrass Fiddle Styles, sometimes called the "yellow Bible" of bluegrass.

Stage and film performances 
In addition to performing music, Kosek has appeared in many dramatic productions: in the movies They All Laughed and The Stepford Wives; on Broadway, in The Robber Bridegroom, Platinum, Play Me A Country Song, Foxfire, Big River, Jerry Garcia on Broadway and Footloose; and off-Broadway, in Feast Here Tonight, Das Barbecü, That and the Cup of Tea, A Celtic Christmas, Lost Highway, and Picon Pie.

Humor 
Kosek is also known as a humorist; he has written for the National Lampoon, contributed to numerous radio programs, and written liner notes for many fellow performers.

Discography 
White Cloud (Good Medicine Records, 1972)
Country Cooking (Rounder Records, 1972)
Demon in Disguise – David Bromberg – (Columbia Records, 1972)
Barrel of Fun (Rounder Records, 1973)
Breakfast Special (Rounder Records, 1976)
Welcome to Wretched Refuse (Betrayal Records, 1977)
Hasty Lonesome (Rounder Records, 1979)
That's Why I'm Here – James Taylor (Columbia Records, 1985)
Almost Acoustic – Jerry Garcia Acoustic Band (Grateful Dead Records, 1988)
Angelwood (Rounder Records, 1997)
Song of the Hills (Shanachie Records, 2000)
Margot Leverett & The Klezmer Mountain Boys (Traditional Crossroads Records, 2003)
Pure Jerry: Lunt-Fontanne, New York City, October 31, 1987 – Jerry Garcia Acoustic Band (Jerry Made Records, 2004)
Pure Jerry: Lunt-Fontanne, New York City, The Best of the Rest, October 15–30, 1987 – Jerry Garcia Acoustic Band (Jerry Made Records, 2004)
 Ragged but Right – Jerry Garcia Acoustic Band (Jerry Made Records, 2010)

References

External links 
 
The Klezmer Mountain Boys
The Citizen Kafka Radio Show

1949 births
People from the Bronx
Musicians from New York City
American bluegrass fiddlers
American country fiddlers
Folk fiddlers
Klezmer fiddlers
American folk musicians
American humorists
Living people
Country musicians from New York (state)
21st-century violinists
Jerry Garcia Acoustic Band members